Gyrinocheilus pennocki, also known as the spotted algae eater, is a species of freshwater fish endemic to the Mekong basin in Cambodia, Vietnam, Laos, and Thailand. It grows to  SL. It is an important species caught both in commercial and artisanal fisheries.

The fish is named in honor of Charles J. Pennock (1857-1935) of Pennsylvania,  an ornithologist to whom Fowler was indebted for acquiring various North American fishes.

Gyrinocheilus pennocki are synonymous to Gyrinocheilus aymonieri but differ in body proportions primarily in head shape.

References

Gyrinocheilidae
Fish of the Mekong Basin
Fish of Cambodia
Fish of Laos
Fish of Thailand
Fish of Vietnam
Taxa named by Henry Weed Fowler
Fish described in 1937